Joshua "Jack" Huddy (November 8, 1735April 12, 1782) was a captain in the Monmouth militia and of the privateer ship The Black Snake during the American Revolutionary War. Following his capture, Huddy was controversially executed by irregular Loyalist forces in 1782.

His execution was noted for precipitating one of the first international incidents of the newly independent United States. In retaliation for Huddy's execution, patriots petitioned for the execution of captive British officer, Charles Asgill, which would have violated the terms of the Articles of Capitulation. This came to be known as the "Asgill Affair". The Kingdom of France, allies of the US, pressured the young nation to show the officer mercy. The Congress of the Confederation voted to order his release.

Early life
Huddy was born November 8, 1735, to a prosperous family in Salem County, Province of New Jersey, the oldest of seven brothers. His grandfather, Hugh Huddy, was a well-known judge in Burlington. Huddy spent most of his early life in Salem, where he was labeled a rebellious troublemaker. He was disowned by Quakers in Salem in 1757 for his "disorderly" conduct.

His troubles continued into adulthood; he was tried and convicted several times for crimes including assault and theft and repeatedly had financial difficulties. He was forced to sell a 300-acre (1.2 km2) plantation in Salem to pay his debts and was forced into debtors' prison for a time. In 1764, he married his first wife, the widowed Mary Borden, by whom he had two daughters, Elizabeth and Martha, before her death.

In the 1770s, Huddy moved to Colts Neck in Monmouth County. There, on October 27, 1778, he married his second wife, Catherine (Applegate) Hart, also a widow and owner of the Colts Neck Tavern, which she had inherited from her first husband, Levy Hart. The Monmouth County sheriff later accused Huddy of trying to steal the tavern from his wife, and to force her children out onto the street. He often appeared in civil and criminal court, either as plaintiff or defendant.

Military career
The outbreak of the American Revolution saw Huddy align himself with the Patriot cause. On September 4, 1777, he was appointed as a captain in the Monmouth Militia by the New Jersey State Legislature. Huddy was a popular and aggressive captain, engaging in the raids and executions that characterized the intense violence within Monmouth County. In October 1777, Huddy allegedly took part in the execution of Loyalist Stephen Edwards, who was dragged from his home in Shrewsbury before being hanged from an oak tree.

Huddy's involvement in the Philadelphia campaign is unclear, though it's widely believed he and his men took part in the Battles of both Germantown (1777) and Monmouth (1778). Huddy and the Monmouth militia also harassed the British as they marched from Freehold to Sandy Hook, where the British Army was planning to travel from New Jersey back to British-occupied New York City.

In August 1780, the Continental Congress issued Huddy a commission to operate a gunboat, The Black Snake, as well as a letter of marque to operate as a privateer. Colonel Tye, a former slave, led a Loyalist night raid of Colts Neck one month later, capturing Huddy in his house. Huddy and his mistress Lucretia Edmonds held off the attackers in a two-hour-long gun battle, but after the Loyalists set fire to his house, Huddy surrendered on the condition they would extinguish the blaze. Colonel Tye took the captive Huddy to Rumson, New Jersey, and put him on a boat bound for New York City. Patriots on the other side of the Shrewsbury River opened fire on the boat, causing it to capsize. Despite being hit in the thigh by a bullet, Huddy escaped and swam to shore.

Capture and execution
On February 1, 1782, Huddy was given command of the blockhouse, a small fort, at the village of Toms River that was built to protect the local salt works. The salt was needed to cure meat destined for American troops, and the Toms River was an important launch point for Patriot privateers. On March 24, a large, irregular force of approximately 80 Associated Loyalists, an organization headed by William Franklin, overwhelmed Huddy's small band of defenders and took the fort. They destroyed the blockhouse, salt works, local mills, and razed all but two houses in the village.

As an officer, Huddy was transferred to a military prison ship New York harbor. Soon, however, Huddy was taken from British custody by a band of Associated Loyalists, headed by Captain Richard Lippincott, ostensibly to make a prisoner exchange. No such exchange was planned; instead, Lippincott's forces took Huddy by boat to Middletown Point, a location on the south coast of Sandy Hook Bay. They landed on the beach at the foot of the Navesink Hills. There, on April 12, 1782, they hanged Huddy after allowing him to dictate and sign his will.

In the rounds of retaliation, Huddy's summary execution by the Loyalists was retaliation for the death, in Patriot custody, of Loyalist farmer Philip White. The executioners left a note pinned to Huddy's body: 

It was reported in a letter to Washington that Huddy maintained his innocence in the death of Phillip White, and that he "should Dye  Innocent, and in a good Cause, and with uncommon Composure of Mind and fortitude prepared Himself for his End" and that "Capt. Huddy dyed  with the firmness of a Lyon ."

The next morning, Patriots found Huddy's body hanging from the gallows, cut it down, and took it to Freehold, where they buried him at Old Tennent Church. Over 400 people gathered to protest his execution, and sent a petition to General George Washington, demanding retribution by execution of a British officer of similar rank if Lippincott was not surrendered. Both Washington and the commander of British forces in New York, General Sir Henry Clinton, condemned the hanging. The British forbade the Board of Loyalists from removing any additional prisoners. Sir Guy Carleton, Clinton's successor, later abolished the organization.

Asgill Affair

Patriotic sentiment ran high following the killing of Huddy. To avert independent reprisals by the New Jersey militia, Washington agreed to the proposition to select a British prisoner of war for retaliatory execution. Washington issued an order to General Moses Hazen to select a British prisoner by lot to be hanged in retribution. Straws were drawn on May 26, 1782, and a young British officer, Captain Charles Asgill, drew the short straw. If Lippincott was not turned over for trial, Asgill was to be executed.

The situation was complicated by the fact that Asgill and the other British captive officers were protected under the terms of surrender agreed to between British General Charles Cornwallis and Washington following the Siege of Yorktown in October of the previous year. Executing Asgill would have violated the terms of the surrender and created a black eye for the rebellious colonials who were intent upon establishing an independent nation.

The British managed to delay Asgill's execution by promising to hold their own court-martial of Lippincott. The court-martial acquitted and freed Lippincott, finding that he had acted on orders from a civil officer, since the Crown still considered William Franklin as officially New Jersey's royal governor.

Washington turned to an old associate, General Benjamin Lincoln, formerly the second in command of the Continental Army and the acting Secretary of War of the Americans. While he and other ranking Continental Army officers continued to favor a retaliatory killing, they urged patience. The delay ultimately allowed sufficient time for intercession by the Americans' French allies. The mother of the condemned British captain appealed directly for help to French King Louis XVI and his wife, Marie Antoinette. French Foreign Minister Comte de Vergennes was directed to plead Asgill's case to Washington.

Catherine Hart, Huddy's widow, also said that she wanted Asgill's life spared since the captain was innocent.

Backed by diplomatic pressure to lift the execution order, the military turned the issue over to the Congress of the Confederation for decision. Asgill was freed by order of Congress passed on November 7, 1782. Asgill was issued a pass to British lines and returned to Britain. After the war, Lippincott emigrated to Canada, where the Loyalist was granted 3,000 acres (12 km2) by the Crown as a reward for his services to Britain.

Legacy

Huddy's legacy lives on throughout Central New Jersey, specifically Monmouth County. In Highlands, New Jersey, Huddy Park as well as a street are named after him. A plaque in West Park in Rumson, New Jersey honors Huddy's escape from the capsized boat he was captured on. Another plaque in Colts Neck, New Jersey was erected in 1977.  There is also a restaurant in Colts Neck, Huddy's Inn, which is situated on the opposite corner from the original Colts Neck Inn. There is also a Huddy Park in Toms River, New Jersey, around the location of the original blockhouse.

References

External links
"Revolutionary War Sites in Toms River, New Jersey: Joshua Huddy Park," Revolutionary War New Jersey, www.revolutionarywarnewjersey.com/

1735 births
1782 deaths
People from Salem County, New Jersey
People of colonial New Jersey
Patriots in the American Revolution
New Jersey militiamen in the American Revolution
Diplomatic incidents
People disowned by the Quakers
Executed people from New Jersey
People executed by the British military by hanging
18th-century executions of American people
Deaths by hanging
American Revolutionary War executions
Burials at Old Tennent Cemetery